Nessia layardi, commonly known as Layard's snake skink or Layard's nessia, is a species of skink, a lizard in the family Scincidae. The species is endemic to the island of Sri Lanka.

Etymology
The specific name, layardi, is in honor of British naturalist Edgar Leopold Layard.

Habitat & geographic range
N. layardi is a poorly known skink from the hills of the Central Province and the wet zone coastal areas. Known localities include Millawa, Wellawatte, Lunava, and Polgahawela.

Description
The snout of N. layardi is subconical. A single loreal is present. The limbs, an ear opening, and supranasals are absent. The dorsum is brown, each scale with a darker margin.

Reproduction
The eggs of N. layardi are deposited in heaps of coconut leaves or in silt over stony substratum.

References

Further reading
Boulenger GA (1887). Catalogue of the Lizards in the British Museum (Natural History). Second Edition. Volume III. ... Scincidæ ... London: Trustees of the British Museum (Natural History). (Taylor and Francis, printers). xii + 575 pp. + Plates I-XL. (Acontias layardi, p. 246).
Boulenger GA (1890). The Fauna of British India, Including Ceylon and Burma. Reptilia and Batrachia. London: Secretary of State for India in Council. (Taylor and Francis, printers). xviii + 541 pp. ("Acontias layardii [sic]", p. 228).
Günther ACLG (1864). The Reptiles of British India. London: The Ray Society. (Taylor and Francis, printers). xxvii + 452 pp. + Plates I-XXVI. (Acontias layardi, p. 96).
Kelaart EF (1853). Prodromus Faunæ Zeylanicæ; being Contributions to the Zoology of Ceylon. Volume II. Colombo: E.F. Kelaart [self-published]. 251 pp. (Acontias layardi, new species, p. 12).
Smith MA (1935). The Fauna of British India, Including Ceylon and Burma. Reptilia and Amphibia. Vol. II.—Sauria. London: Secretary of State for India in Council. (Taylor and Francis, printers). xiii + 440 pp. + Plate I + 2 maps. (Nessia layardi, new combination, p. 359).

External links
http://reptile-database.reptarium.cz/species?genus=Nessia&species=layardi
https://web.archive.org/web/20140714230756/http://www.arkive.org/nessia/nessia-layardi/image-G119901.html
https://www.gbif.org/species/5225308

Nessia
Reptiles of Sri Lanka
Endemic fauna of Sri Lanka
Reptiles described in 1853
Taxa named by Edward Frederick Kelaart